The 1919 Texas A&M Aggies football team was an American football team that represented Texas A&M University in the Southwest Conference during the 1919 college football season. In their second season under head coach Dana X. Bible, the Aggies compiled a 10–0, won the Southwest Conference championship, did not allow a single point during the season, and outscored opponents by a total of 275 to 0. Texas A&M began the season with a doubleheader in College Station and scored a combined 105 points. 

There was no contemporaneous system in 1919 for determining a national champion. However, Texas A&M was retroactively named as the national champion for 1919 by the Billingsley Report (using its alternate "margin of victory" methodology) and as a co-national champion with Harvard and Notre Dame by the National Championship Foundation. 

Overall, Texas A&M won 79.8% of their games played in the decade, with 77.4% of all games being at home for the Aggies.

Schedule

References

Texas AandM
Texas A&M Aggies football seasons
College football national champions
Southwest Conference football champion seasons
College football undefeated seasons
Texas AandM Aggies football